The Pui Ching Middle Schools is a system of Baptist secondary schools first founded in Guangzhou, Guangdong Province, China and later Hong Kong and Macau. Located at Peizheng Road in Yuexiu District, Guangzhou Pui Ching Middle School is a state-owned full-time public school with its campus covering an area of nearly 70,000 square meters. The school has 36 classes for senior grade and 26 classes for the junior grade. There are 230 teachers, among whom 66 people are senior teachers.

History 
The original Guangzhou school was founded in 1889 by local Chinese Baptists, and was the first Christian school in China founded by local Christians rather than foreign missionaries. The Guangzhou school was disbanded and students moved to Macau in January 1938 due to the spread of World War II to Southern China. The Guangzhou school was subsequently reopened after the war.

School song 
The lyrics of the school song come from a poem, written by Li Zhu-hou, a Chinese language teacher at Pui Ching Middle School. The song was arranged by Ho An-tung, with its melody identical to Wien Neêrlands Bloed, the former national anthem of the Netherlands.

Macau School 

The Guangzhou school was moved to Macau in 1938. It is now an integrated grammar school with more than 3,000 students in its kindergarten, primary school, junior high and senior high sections.

Hong Kong School

Guangzhou School

Notable alumni
David K. Lam, Founder and Former CEO of Lam Research Corporation

References

External links

 Hong Kong school homepage
 Macau school homepage

Schools in China
Schools in Guangdong
Christian schools in China
Secondary schools in Hong Kong
Schools in Macau
Baptist Christianity in China
Educational institutions established in 1889
Baptist schools
1889 establishments in China
Middle Schools in Guangzhou
Junior secondary schools in China
Protestant secondary schools in Hong Kong